Richard Heinzel (3 November 1838, in Capodistira – 4 April 1905, in Vienna) was an Austrian philologist who specialized in Germanic studies.

Biography
Richard Heinzel studied classical and German philology at the University of Vienna, where his instructors were Franz Pfeiffer and Johannes Vahlen. From 1860 to 1864 he worked as a school teacher at gymnasiums in Trieste, Linz and Vienna, and in 1868 became a professor at the University of Graz. In 1873 he succeeded Wilhelm Scherer as professor of German language and literature at the University of Vienna. In 1874 he became a member of the Vienna Academy of Sciences.

Selected works 
 Heinrich von Melk (as editor, 1867) – On Heinrich von Melk.
 Geschichte der niederfränkischen geschäftssprache, 1874 – History of the Lower Franconian language. 
 Wortschatz und Sprachformen der wiener Notker-Handschrift, 1875 –  Vocabulary and language forms of the Viennese Notker manuscript.
 Über den stil der altgermanischen poesie, 1875 – On the style of Old German poetry.
 Notkers Psalmen nach der Wiener handschrift, with Wilhelm Scherer, 1876 – Notker's psalms; according to the Viennese manuscript.
 Über die endsilben der altnordsichen sprache, 1877 – On the final syllables of Old Norse language.
 Ueber die Hervararsaga, 1877 –  On the Hervarar saga.
 Beschreibung der isländischen Saga, 1881 – Description of the Icelandic saga.
 Ueber die Walthersage, 1889 – On the Walther saga.
 Über die ostgothische Heldensage, 1889 – On the East Gothic hero saga. 
 Deutsche studien. I. und II, with Wilhelm Scherer (2nd edition, 1891) – German studies.
 Über die französischen Gralromane, 1891 – On the French grail novel.
 Über Wolframs von Eschenbach Parzival, 1893 – On Wolfram von Eschenbach's Parzival.
 Beschreibung des geistlichen Schauspiels im deutschen Mittelalter, 1898 – Description of the spiritual drama in the German Middle Ages.

See also

 Theodor Möbius
 Hugo Gering
 Wolfgang Golther
 Andreas Heusler
 Otto Höfler

References 

1838 births
1905 deaths
Writers from Koper
University of Vienna alumni
Academic staff of the University of Vienna
Academic staff of the University of Graz
Austrian medievalists
Germanists
Germanic studies scholars
Linguists of Germanic languages
Austrian philologists